Brittany Kassil (born 14 March 1991) is a Canadian rugby union player.

Kassil was born in Mississauga and lived in Markham before moving with her family to Guelph in Grade 7. She attended Centennial Collegiate Vocational Institute and was introduced to rugby by friends. She also played for the University of Guelph Gryphons women's team.

Kassil made her international debut for Canada in 2017 at the Can-Am Series. She was later selected in their World Cup squad that year.

Kassil competed for Canada at the delayed 2021 Rugby World Cup in New Zealand.

References

External links 

 Brittany Kassil at Canada Rugby

Living people
1991 births
Female rugby union players
Canadian female rugby union players
Canada women's international rugby union players